In 2022, at least 77 inmates were killed during prison riots in Ecuador.

Background

Ecuador is in between Colombia and Peru, which are the world's two largest cocaine-producing countries. It is severely affected by international drug trafficking and gang violence which is related to that. In 2021, about 300 inmates were killed in riots in Ecuadorian prisons. The Ecuadorian government says that the riots are caused by gang warfare over control of territory and drug trafficking routes.

2022 riots
On 3 April, at least 20 inmates were killed during a riot inside El Turi prison in Cuenca, southern Ecuador.

On 9 May, a riot broke out between members of rival gangs Los Lobos and R7 inside Bellavista prison in Santo Domingo, central Ecuador. Forty-four inmates were killed. A hundred and twelve inmates tried to escape during the riot, but were apprehended inside the prison grounds.

On 18 July, 13 inmates were killed and two more injured after a riot broke out again in the Bellavista prison in Santo Domingo.

On 3 October, 15 inmates were killed during a riot at Cotopaxi No 1 jail in Latacunga, Cotopaxi Province.

On 18 November, 10 inmates were killed during a riot in a prison in Quito.

See also
 Ecuadorian security crisis
 Illegal drug trade in Latin America
 February 2021 Ecuadorian prison riots
 September 2021 Guayaquil prison riot
 November 2021 Guayaquil prison riot

References

2022 murders in Ecuador
2022 riots
21st century in Quito
21st-century mass murder in South America
April 2022 crimes in South America
Cotopaxi Province
2022 prison riots
July 2022 crimes in South America
2022 prison riots
May 2022 crimes in South America
November 2022 crimes
November 2022 events in South America
October 2022 crimes
October 2022 events in South America
Organized crime events in South America
2022
Santo Domingo de los Tsáchilas Province
Violent non-state actor incidents in South America